James W. Adams of Southville, Kentucky was a carpenter, builder, and designer in south central Shelby County, Kentucky.

A number of his works are listed on the U.S. National Register of Historic Places.

Works
Carriss's Feed Store, built in 1915, at KY 55 and KY 44, Southville, Kentucky (Adams,James W.), NRHP-listed
Carriss's Store, KY 714 and KY 53, Southville, Kentucky (Adams,James W.), NRHP-listed
Gray House, Zaring Mill Rd., .3 mi. S of Locust Grove Rd., Shelbyville, Kentucky (Adams,James W.), NRHP-listed
Dr. William Morris Office and House, KY 53, Southville, Kentucky (Adams,James W.), NRHP-listed

References

American carpenters
20th-century American architects
People from Shelby County, Kentucky
Year of birth missing
Year of death missing